Arisbe (Ancient Greek: Ἀρίσβη) may refer to:

 Another name for Batea (daughter of Teucer), a person in Greek mythology
 Arisbe (daughter of Merops), an early wife of King Priam of Troy, also  daughter of the seer Merops of Percote
 Arisba, an ancient city in the Troad
 Arisba (Lesbos), an ancient town on Lesbos
 arisbe, a species of owl butterflies
Arisbe, American philosopher Charles Sanders Peirce's estate in Pennsylvania